The  was an overnight train service that operated in Japan from October 1961 until January 2013. Reduced to seasonal operations in March 2012, the service was officially discontinued in January 2013.

Route
The Kitaguni ran on the following lines:

JR West
 Kyoto Line (Tōkaidō Main Line): Osaka - Kyoto
 Biwako Line (Tōkaidō Main Line/Hokuriku Line): Kyoto - Nagahama
 Hokuriku Line: Nagahama - Naoetsu

JR East
 Shinetsu Line: Naoetsu - Niigata

Service pattern
The southbound train originated at Niigata Station at 22:55, arriving in Osaka at 06:49.

The northbound service left Osaka at 23:27, terminating at Niitsu Station at 08:10. It then continued as a local train for the final 15-minutes to Niigata.

Rolling stock
The Kitaguni used dedicated 581/583 series EMU trains consisting of reserved accommodation only.

Fares

A flat fee was charged for type "A" and "B" reserved sleeping car accommodation, regardless of starting or ending location, while Green Car (first class) reserved accommodation rates were based on distance. In the final days of the train's operations, accommodation rates ranged from about ¥6,000 for a type "B" berth to about ¥10,000 for a type "A" berth. A Green Car seat covering the entire distance from Osaka to Niigata cost ¥5,150.

The other fares, the basic fare and express fare, were based on distance. For tourists using the Japan Rail Pass, the basic fare did not have to be paid.

History

The Kitaguni service first ran on 1 October 1961, as an express between Kanazawa and Niigata. From 1 October 1968, the service was extended to operate between Osaka and Aomori.

From the start of the 17 March 2012 timetable revision, regular operations of the Kitaguni were discontinued, with services operating during busy seasonal periods only.

On 31 January 2013, JR West announced that the Kitaguni service had been formally discontinued following the seasonal runs over the New Year period.

See also
 List of named passenger trains of Japan

References

External links

  

Named passenger trains of Japan
Night trains of Japan
West Japan Railway Company
Railway services introduced in 1961
Railway services discontinued in 2013
2013 disestablishments in Japan
1961 establishments in Japan